Eupseudosoma is a genus of moths in the family Erebidae. The genus was erected by Augustus Radcliffe Grote in 1865. The best known and most widespread species is Eupseudosoma involutum, the snowy eupseudosoma, a bright white moth which is found from the southern United States right down to the south of South America. There are a few other species found across the Americas.

Species
 Eupseudosoma aberrans Schaus, 1905
Recorded food plants include Diospyros, Eucalyptus, Eugenia and Psidium
 Eupseudosoma agramma Hampson, 1901
 Eupseudosoma grandis Rothschild, 1909
 Eupseudosoma involutum Sepp, 1855 – snowy eupseudosoma
Recorded food plants include Diospyros, Eucalyptus, Eugenia and Psidium
 Eupseudosoma larissa (Druce, 1890)

Former species
 Eupseudosoma bifasciata (Cramer, [1779])
 Eupseudosoma eurygania (Druce, 1897)

References

Phaegopterina
Moth genera